Minuscule 271 (in the Gregory-Aland numbering), ε 169 (Soden), is a Greek minuscule manuscript of the New Testament, on parchment. Palaeographically it has been assigned to the 11th century.

Description 

The codex contains the text of the four Gospels on 252 parchment leaves. The text is written in two columns per page, in 22 lines per page.

There is also another division according to the smaller Ammonian Sections, but without references to the Eusebian Canons.

Text 

The Greek text of the codex is a representative of the Byzantine text-type. Hermann von Soden classified it to Ak (Antiocheian – i.e. Byzantine – commentated text). Kurt Aland did not place it in any Category.
According to the Claremont Profile Method it represents textual family Kx in Luke 1 and Luke 20, and belongs to the textual cluster Ω. In Luke 10 no profile was made.

Textually it is close to the codex 53.

History 

The manuscripts was added to the list of New Testament manuscripts by Scholz (1794-1852). It was examined and described by Paulin Martin. C. R. Gregory saw it in 1885.

The manuscript is currently housed at the Bibliothèque nationale de France (Suppl. Gr. 75) at Paris.

See also 

 List of New Testament minuscules
 Biblical manuscript
 Textual criticism

References

Further reading 

 

Greek New Testament minuscules
11th-century biblical manuscripts
Bibliothèque nationale de France collections